Catete is a town and commune in the municipality of Ícolo e Bengo, province of Luanda, Angola.

Transport
It is served by a railway station on the Luanda Railways.

Catete is the major graveyard for old steam locomotives on the northern line.

The station is here.

Notable people
 Agostinho Neto, first President of Angola
 Deolinda Rodrigues Francisco de Almeida, Angolan nationalist

See also
 Railway stations in Angola

References

External links

 iTouchmap: Catete

Communes in Luanda Province
Populated places in Luanda Province